Adnan bin Abdul Kareem Ahmed Alkaissy El Farthie (born 1 March, 1939), better known professionally as Adnan Al-Kaissie, is an Iraqi former professional wrestler and manager best known as Sheik Adnan Al-Kaissey, Billy White Wolf, or General Adnan. In 1971 he defeated André the Giant in Al-Shaab Stadium in Baghdad, under the auspices of his former friend at high school Saddam Hussein. He competed in the World Wide Wrestling Federation (WWWF). On December 7, 1976, he won the WWWF World tag team championship with Chief Jay Strongbow.

In 1981, Adnan Al-Kaissie joined the American Wrestling Association (AWA), in 1990 he joined the World Wrestling Federation (WWF formerly WWWF, now known as the WWE), where he managed Sgt. Slaughter under the name "General Adnan". He competed at SummerSlam 1991 with his partners Sgt. Slaughter and Col. Mustafa in a Handicap match with Sid Justice as special guest referee against Hulk Hogan and The Ultimate Warrior. Al-Kaissie became the first Iraqi and an ethnic Arab to compete in a WWF/E ring.

Early life 
Adnan Al-Kaissy was born Adnan Bin Abdulkareem Ahmed Al-kaissy El Farthie in Baghdad, Iraq. According to his autobiography, he came from a fairly distinguished family, with his father being an imam (Muslim preacher). One of his high school classmates was Saddam Hussein. He had an amateur wrestling career in Iraq and attended Oklahoma State University.

Professional wrestling career

Early career (1959-1974)

Al-Kaissy began wrestling in the state of Oklahoma in 1959 under the ring name "Adnan Kaissey".

Kassey wrestled for Pacific Northwest Wrestling in the 1960s. In 1964, Adnan, who had married an American woman, became a United States citizen.

During the 1970s, he took professional wrestling to Iraq under the direction of Saddam Hussein. In one such match, he defeated André the Giant in Baghdad in 1971 and he defeated the Scottish Ian Campbell and the Canadian champion George Gordienko in Baghdad.

New Japan Pro-Wrestling and Florida (1974-1975)
In 1974, Adnan debuted in New Japan Pro-Wrestling as the Sheik of Sheiks of Baghdad, he teamed with Nikolai Volkoff and they tried to win the NWA North American Tag Team but they failed after losing the Best Two Out Of Three Falls match against Antonio Inoki and Seiji Sakaguchi at Aichi Prefectural Gymnasium in Aichi, Japan. Later he feuded with the likes of Antonio Inoki, Seiji Sakaguchi, Kantaro Hoshino, Osamu Kido, Haruka Eigen. After he left NJPW, Adnan returned to the United States, where he wrestled in Eddie Graham's promotion Championship Wrestling from Florida under his real name.

World Wide Wrestling Federation (1976–1977)
In the World Wide Wrestling Federation, in 1976, under the Native American gimmick Billy White Wolf, he won the World Tag Team Titles with Chief Jay Strongbow. Needing neck surgery, Kassey agreed to work an injury angle where he had his neck broken by Ken Patera via the Swinging Neckbreaker on television. After he left the territory for his neck surgery in 1977, the "Indians" were stripped of their titles.

Various Promotions (1977–1981)
In 1978, he wrestled in Hawaii and was the master of the "Indian Death Match" until his arch-rival, Tor Kamata, defeated him. Not long after, he returned briefly to Iraq with the intent of introducing pro wrestling. By this time, his old classmate Saddam was ruler of the country. By his own account, it was a difficult time, for although Kaissey was very popular and had some success introducing professional wrestling to Iraq, Saddam was already becoming paranoid about potential rivals, and he saw Kaissey in this light. Kaissey fled back to the US and never returned, though he kept contact with his family in Baghdad.

American Wrestling Association (1981–1989)
In 1981, with tensions between the US and Middle East running high, he debuted in the American Wrestling Association as "Sheik Adnan El Kaissey," where his stated goal was to win the AWA title from champion Nick Bockwinkel. He failed at that task, so he then enlisted Jerry Blackwell, now wearing a sheik's outfit and renamed Sheik Ayatollah Jerry Blackwell, to team with him to try to win the AWA tag team titles. That failed, too, so Adnan bought Ken Patera from manager Bobby Heenan to team with Blackwell, and Adnan would act as Blackwell and Patera's manager. The team of Blackwell and Patera captured the AWA World tag team title from Greg Gagne and Jim Brunzell. Adnan had to quit wrestling when he was injured, which is the real reason Patera was brought in to team with Blackwell. On April 23, 1983, at the AWA Super Sunday, he teamed with Blackwell in a tag team match against Verne Gagne and Mad Dog Vachon which they lost. In 1986 at AWA WrestleRock he lost to Verne Gagne in a steel cage; he then teamed with Boris Zhukov in a tag team match against The Midnight Rockers (Marty Jannetty & Shawn Michaels). Kassie later left the AWA, but returned on a November 26, 1988, card in Bloomington, Minnesota, when he managed The Iron Sheik (who he would also later manage in the WWF) in a match against Sgt. Slaughter.

World Wrestling Federation (1990–1992)
In the World Wrestling Federation, during the summer of 1990, he allied with Sgt. Slaughter as "General Adnan," and managed him during his pro-Iraqi gimmick in a feud with Hulk Hogan and The Ultimate Warrior. During this feud, Slaughter won the WWF title from the Warrior at the 1991 Royal Rumble, and lost it a couple of months later to Hogan at WrestleMania VII.

The pair were then joined by Slaughter's former nemesis, The Iron Sheik, who was repackaged as Colonel Mustafa, to form the Triangle of Terror. Adnan also headlined SummerSlam 1991 with Slaughter and Mustafa against Hogan and Warrior. During the build-up to Survivor Series 1990, the WWE showed what they claimed were "classified top secret photos released by the Pentagon/CIA" that featured General Adnan with Saddam Hussein. After Slaughter turned face, Adnan continued to manage Col. Mustafa until leaving the WWF shortly after Royal Rumble 1992.

Al-Kaissie is also featured as a playable character in the WWE 2K15 video game; in where he appears as a downloadable character as part of the "Path of the Warrior" Showcase. He was once again featured as a playable character in WWE 2K16.

Later career (1992-1998)
After WWF he then joined American Wrestling Federation (AWF) where he managed "The Rat Pack" of Bob Orton Jr, Mr. Hughes & Manny Fernandez. He also managed Hercules Hernandez.

He retired from wrestling in 1998.

Personal life 
He formerly managed his own company, the World All-Star Wrestling Alliance, which he co-owned with Ken Patera.

On November 22, 2006, he appeared on Fox News Channel's Hannity & Colmes describing his encounters with a young Saddam Hussein.

Autobiography
In 2005, Triumph Books published his memoirs as The Sheik of Baghdad: Tales of Celebrity and Terror from Pro Wrestling's General Adnan.

Championships and accomplishments
 50th State Big Time Wrestling
NWA United States Heavyweight Championship (Hawaii version) (1 time)
NWA Hawaii Tag Team Championship (1 time) – with Neff Maiava
 George Tragos/Lou Thesz Professional Wrestling Hall of Fame
 Class of 2020
 NWA Australia
Australian Heavyweight Championship (1 time)
 Pacific Northwest Wrestling
NWA Pacific Northwest Heavyweight Championship (2 times)
NWA Pacific Northwest Tag Team Championship (4 times) – with Shag Thomas (1), Pepper Martin (1), Bearcat Wright (1), and Johnny War Eagle (1)
 Pro Wrestling Illustrated
PWI ranked him # 410 of the 500 best singles wrestlers during the "PWI Years" in 2003.
 Southwest Sports, Inc.
NWA Texas Heavyweight Championship (1 time
NWA World Tag Team Championship (1 time) – with Hogan Wharton
 World Championship Wrestling (Australia)
IWA World Heavyweight Championship (1 time)
IWA World Tag Team Championship (2 times) – with Mario Milano (1) and Tex McKenzie (1)
 World Wide Wrestling Federation
WWWF World Tag Team Championship (1 time) – with Chief Jay Strongbow

References

External links 
 

1939 births
Faux Native American professional wrestlers
Iraqi emigrants to the United States
Iraqi Sunni Muslims
Living people
Oklahoma State University alumni
Sportspeople from Baghdad
Professional wrestling managers and valets
Professional wrestling trainers
Iraqi professional wrestlers
20th-century professional wrestlers
IWA World Heavyweight Champions (Australia)
IWA World Tag Team Champions (Australia)